Hedin Nunatak is a conspicuous nunatak with a flat top capped with ice and steep bare rock walls, standing  west-northwest of the summit of Mount Murphy, on the Walgreen Coast of Marie Byrd Land, Antarctica. It was first roughly mapped from air photos taken in January 1947 by U.S. Navy Operation Highjump, and was named by the Advisory Committee on Antarctic Names after Alan E. Hedin, an aurora researcher at Byrd Station in 1962.

References

Nunataks of Marie Byrd Land